The Yamuna is a river in India.

It can also refer to:
Yamuna in Hinduism
 Yamunacharya (10th century), an India philosopher
 Yamuna, a 2013 Tamil film
 , a British India Line passenger ship
 Yamuna (actress), an Indian actress appeared in Telugu, Kannada films and serials
 Yamuna Devi, author of The Art of Indian Vegetarian Cooking

See also 
 Jamuna (disambiguation)